One 1958 Plymouth Sedan v. Pennsylvania, 380 U.S. 693 (1965), was a Supreme Court of the United States case handed down in 1965. The Court ruled that civil forfeiture could not apply where the evidence used to invoke the forfeiture was obtained illegally.

Some police officers followed the suspect vehicle, and pulled over the car because it was "riding low". Without a warrant, they searched the trunk and found untaxed liquor. The car was seized, and the state also attempted to confiscate the automobile in question as a civil penalty. The Court ruled unanimously that the Fourth Amendment's protection against unreasonable searches and seizures, held applicable to the states by the Fourteenth Amendment, applies to civil actions by the states as well as criminal ones, noting that one could be subject to an even worse penalty in a civil proceeding, where the value of the items being forfeited might be more than the maximum possible fine in a criminal case.

See also
List of United States Supreme Court cases, volume 380
United States v. Article Consisting of 50,000 Cardboard Boxes More or Less, Each Containing One Pair of Clacker Balls
United States v. $124,700 in U.S. Currency
United States v. Approximately 64,695 Pounds of Shark Fins

External links

 

1965 in United States case law
United States civil forfeiture case law
United States Fourth Amendment case law
United States in rem cases
United States Supreme Court cases
United States Supreme Court cases of the Warren Court
Plymouth (automobile)